Wyoming Highway 193 (WYO 193) is a  north–south Wyoming State Road that runs through southern Sheridan County and the extreme northern part of Johnson County and serves the community of Story.

Route description

Wyoming Highway 193 begins its southern end at U.S. Route 87 and Wyoming Highway 346 near the Fort Phil Kearny Historic Site and northwest of Interstate 90 (Exit 44). WYO 346 is the designation for the old southern section of US 87 that has been closed due to landslides. Because of the landslides, US 87 temporarily overlaps WYO 193 in its entirety. Highway 193 travels northwesterly towards the community of Story, reaching the community at just under 4 miles where it intersects the eastern terminus of Wyoming Highway 194. Leaving the eastern edge of Story, WYO 193 heads north to the unincorporated community of Banner where it reaches its northern terminus at U.S. Route 87 and its unsigned concurrent designation of Wyoming Highway 344.

History

In the late 1990s, a short section of US 87/WYO 344 between Interstate 90 north of Buffalo and Sheridan, at the Massacre Hill Historic Site, had been permanently closed due to recurring landslides. According to the Wyoming Department of Transportation, the stretch of roadway has ongoing and costly maintenance problems, with the most recent landslides closing the roadway as of the Spring of 1998. Because repairing the roadway could potentially damage the historic site, WYDOT recommends that through traffic use either Interstate 90 or Wyoming 193 as an alternate route.

As a result of the landslide on US 87, Wyoming petitioned the American Association of State Highway and Transportation Officials (or AASHTO) to reroute US 87 over Highway 193 in the late 1990s, however was denied. Consequently, a detour for US 87 follows WYO 193 since it is unlikely that US 87 will be reconstructed at its current location.

Major intersections

See also

References

External links 

Wyoming State Routes 100-199
U.S. Route 87
WYO 193 - US 87 to WYO 194
WYO 193 - WYO 194 to US 87

Transportation in Johnson County, Wyoming
Transportation in Sheridan County, Wyoming
193